Francis Furlong (8 February 1887 – 26 February 1952) was an Irish Gaelic footballer. His championship career with the Wexford senior team lasted five seasons from 1913 until 1917.

Honours

Wexford
All-Ireland Senior Football Championship (3): 1915, 1916, 1917
Leinster Senior Football Championship (4): 1913, 1915, 1916, 1917

References

1887 births
1952 deaths
Blues and Whites Gaelic footballers
Wexford inter-county Gaelic footballers